Lazaro Beltran (born 27 February 1964) is a Cuban volleyball player. He competed in the men's tournament at the 1992 Summer Olympics.

References

External links
 

1964 births
Living people
Cuban men's volleyball players
Olympic volleyball players of Cuba
Volleyball players at the 1992 Summer Olympics
Place of birth missing (living people)
Pan American Games medalists in volleyball
Pan American Games gold medalists for Cuba
Pan American Games silver medalists for Cuba
Medalists at the 1983 Pan American Games
Medalists at the 1987 Pan American Games
Medalists at the 1991 Pan American Games